The Memories Attack is a Canadian indie pop duo from Atlantic Canada. The group consists of Eric's Trip guitarist Chris Thompson and Ron Bates of the pop group Orange Glass.

History
Thompson and Bates met during childhood and had worked together previously under Thompson's solo project Moon Socket. They composed their self-titled debut album while living in separate cities, recording in Bates' basement studio when Thompson was able to make the trip to Halifax, Nova Scotia from his home in Fredericton, New Brunswick. The album appeared on the !earshot National Top 50 chart in January, 2007.

Their music has been described as "hazy, sludgy pop" with an "infectiously upbeat, if delicate, feel".

Their track "Love in the Time of Hate" has been in frequent rotation at CBC Radio 3 and reached No. 1 on the R3-30 chart the week of April 26, 2007.

Their second album was released in December 2008 on East Coast label Noyes Records.

Discography
2006: The Memories Attack
2008: The Memories Attack

References

External links
The Memories Attack at MySpace
The Memories Attack at CBC Radio 3

Musical groups established in 2006
Musical groups from Halifax, Nova Scotia
Canadian indie pop groups
Tumult Records artists